The second season of The Voice Brasil premiered on Thursday, October 3, 2013 on Globo in the  (BRT / AMT) slot, immediately following the primetime telenovela Amor à Vida. Instead of airing on Sundays afternoons, the show is now broadcast on Thursdays nights.

All four of the original coaches returned for this season. Tiago Leifert, the host of the show, also returned. Danni Suzuki was replaced by Miá Mello as the show's backstage correspondent.

On December 29, 2013, Sam Alves from Team Claudia won the competition with 43% of the final vote over Lucy Alves (Team Brown), Pedro Lima (Team Lulu) and Rubens Daniel (Team Daniel). Alves previously sang in the blind auditions of season four of The Voice in the United States but failed to make a team.

Selection process
Auditions

Online applications for The Voice Brasil were open from December 16, 2012 to April 18, 2013. Selected applications were then called to regional auditions held in eight capital cities across Brazil:

Teams
 Key

Blind auditions
Key

Battles

Key

Live shows
In this season, for the first time, only viewers from Southern, Southeast, Northeastern, Central-Western time zones vote during the live broadcasts, while viewers in the Amazon time zone (minus Amapá, Pará and Tocantins) are cued to vote to save artists on the show's official website during the delayed broadcast. For the final, the lines were opened right after the semifinal results and remaining opened until the live finale, so all the country was able to vote for the winner.

Key

Week 1: Playoffs

Week 2: Playoffs

Week 3: Quarterfinals

Week 4: Semifinals

Week 5: Finals

Elimination chart
Key

Results

Ratings and reception

Brazilian ratings
All numbers are in points and provided by Kantar Ibope Media.

References

External links
 The Voice Brasil (2013) on MemóriaGlobo.com

2
2013 Brazilian television seasons